Lioglyphostoma tenuata is an extinct species of sea snail, a marine gastropod mollusk in the family Pseudomelatomidae, the turrids and allies.

Description
The length of the shell attains 12.4 mm; its diameter 3.7 mm.

Distribution
Fossils have been found in Miocene and Pliocene strata of Okinawa.

References

 MacNeil, FS 1960. Tertiary and Quaternary Gastropoda of Okinawa. United States Geological Survey Professional Paper, 339: 148 p.; USGS, US Government Printing Office, Washington.

tenuata
Gastropods described in 1960
Extinct molluscs